Hema Malini is an Indian actress who primarily works in Bollywood films. Apart from being an actress, she has also worked as a director, producer, dancer-choreographer, and politician. Malini made her acting debut as a lead actress through the 1968 Hindi film Sapno Ka Saudagar, and went on to appear in numerous films throughout the 1970s and 80s. Her performances in both commercial and arthouse productions won a lot of accolades. During her career, Malini has been nominated 11 times for the Filmfare Award for Best Actress, of which she won once in 1972 for her role as twin-sisters in Seeta Aur Geeta; the first time she was nominated for the award. She received two nominations in a single year on two occasions – Amir Garib, Prem Nagar (both in 1974) and Sanyasi, Mehbooba (both in 1975). Malini was initially promoted as "Dream Girl" of Bollywood, and went on to star in a film of the same name in 1977. After her marriage with co-star Dharmendra, she continued to act in various films which included a few art films. Malini's portrayal as an attitudinal wife in Rihaee won her a Filmfare Best Actress nomination for the tenth time. In 2000, she was presented with the Filmfare Lifetime Achievement Award for her contribution to films. In the same year, she was honoured with the Padma Shri, India's fourth-highest civilian honour. The Sir Padampat Singhania University conferred an Honorary Doctorate upon Malini in recognition of her contribution to Indian cinema in 2012. After a brief hiatus, Malini made a comeback with Baghban in 2003. She played an elderly woman and was paired opposite Amitabh Bachchan, earning a Best Actress Award nomination from Filmfare for the eleventh time. She received lot of praise and nominations for her work in the film such as the Most Sensational Actress at the Bollywood Movie Awards and the Star Screen Award Jodi No. 1.

Civilian award

Honorary Doctorate

Filmfare Awards

Bollywood Movie Awards

Screen Awards

Zee Cine Awards

Other awards and honours 
 1998 – Guest of Honour Award at the 18th Ujala Cinema Express Awards
 2004 – Sports World's "Jodi of the Year" along with Amitabh Bachchan for Baghban
 2004 – Icon of the year
 2004 – "Living Legend Award" by the Federation of Indian Chamber of Commerce and Industry (FICCI) in recognition of her contribution to the Indian entertainment industry
 2005 – Ranked as one of the "Most popular Actress in India" by the Hansa Research's new syndicated study, Celebrity Track.
 2006 – "SaMaPa Vitasta Award 2006" in Delhi by SAMAPA – "Sopori Academy of Music And Performing Arts" for her contribution and service to Dance.
 2007 – Rashtrabhushan Award From FIE Foundation Ichalkaranji
 2007 – The 2007 Bangkok International Film Festival screened several films starring Hema Malini in a special tribute programme
 2008 – Honoured for her contribution to classical dance
 2009 – Lifetime Achievement Award at the 7th Pune International Film Festival (PIFF)
 2010 – The Best Face make Up Award 2010
 2010 – Rajinikanth Legend award
 2010 – Rajiv Gandhi Award
 2011 – PETA'S Person of the Year
 2011 – ANR National Award
 2011 – Aadhi Aabadi Women Achievers award for her contribution to Indian cinema
 2012 – International Personality of the Year award at the 12th Asian Achievers Awards
 2012 – Postal stamp issued by the Government of Norway at the 10th Annual Bollywood Festival
 2012 – Bharat Muni Samman for outstanding contribution to the field of art and culture
2018 – Lux Golden Rose Iconic Beauty Over the Decades Award at the 2018 Lux Golden Rose Awards
 2021 – Honoured with Indian Film Personality of the Year Award at 52nd International Film Festival of India.

References 

Lists of awards received by Indian actor